The Progressive Conservative Party of Prince Edward Island leadership election of 1996 was held on May 4, 1996, to elect a new leader to succeed Pat Mella.

Candidates
Pat Binns, former MP for Cardigan
Wes MacAleer, businessman
Gary Morgan, doctor

Results

First Ballot

References
Stewart, Ian and Stewart, David K. "Conventional choices : Maritime leadership politics." University of British Columbia Press, 2007.

1996
1996 in Prince Edward Island
1996 elections in Canada
Progressive Conservative Party of Prince Edward Island leadership election